Gianuario (Ariuccio) Carta, (1 January 1931 – 14 February 2017) was an Italian politician of the Christian Democracy political party.

Biography 
Born in Bitti, Sardinia, on January 1, 1931, Carta graduated with a law degree from Università Cattolica del Sacro Cuore. He was a lawyer and president of province of Nuoro lawyers.

Prior to entering national politics he served on a regional council in 1965. Carta was first elected to the Italian Chamber of Deputies in 1968 as a Christian Democrat, where he would continue to serve until 1983. Following this, he took a position in the Italian Senate, where he remained from 1983 to 1992. During this period, he also served as minister of the Merchant Navy from 1983 to 1986, in the Craxi I Cabinet.

During the 10th legislature, he was called to chair the Senate's parliamentary Agriculture and Forestry Committee, and subsequently, starting from its establishment, the bicameral parliamentary commission of inquiry on the scandal of the branch of the Banca Nazionale del Lavoro (BNL) in Atlanta.

He served as the lawyer of the Melis family who successfully sued the Ministry of Defense for the death of family member who died from depleted uranium poisoning after serving in Kosovo.

He died in Cagliari on February 14, 2017.

External links 

 Italian Parliament Page
 Italian Senate Page

References

1931 births
2017 deaths
People from the Province of Nuoro
Christian Democracy (Italy) politicians
Deputies of Legislature V of Italy
Deputies of Legislature VI of Italy
Deputies of Legislature VII of Italy
Deputies of Legislature VIII of Italy
Politicians of Sardinia
20th-century Italian lawyers
Senators of Legislature IX of Italy
Senators of Legislature X of Italy